St. Peter's Cathedral, or variations of the name, may refer to:

Australia
 St Peter's Cathedral, Adelaide, an Anglican cathedral in the South Australian capital of Adelaide
 St Peter's Cathedral, Armidale, an Anglican cathedral in New South Wales

Bangladesh
 St Peter's Cathedral, Barisal, a cathedral in Barisal, Bangladesh

Canada
St. Peter's Cathedral Basilica, London, Ontario
Cathedral of Saint Peter-in-Chains, Peterborough, Ontario
St. Peter's Cathedral (Charlottetown), Prince Edward Island

Croatia
Đakovo Cathedral, Cathedral basilica of St. Peter in Đakovo

France
St. Peter's Cathedral, Vannes, Brittany

Germany
 St. Peter's Cathedral (Osnabrück), Lower Saxony
 Bremen Cathedral, dedicated to St. Peter
 Cologne Cathedral, North Rhine-Westphalia, dedicated to St. Peter
 Regensburg Cathedral, Bavaria, dedicated to St. Peter
 Cathedral of St. Peter at Schleswig, Schleswig-Holstein
 Cathedral of Saint Peter, Trier, Rhineland-Palatinate
 Cathedral of St Peter, Worms, Rhineland-Palatinate

Indonesia
St. Peter's Cathedral, Bandung

Ireland
St. Peter the Rock Cathedral, Cashel

Italy

Cathedral Basilica of St. Peter Apostle, Frascati

Morocco
St. Peter's Cathedral, Rabat, a Roman Catholic cathedral located in downtown Rabat, Morocco, at place du Golan (Golan Square). It is built in Art Deco and is the seat of the Archdiocese of Rabat

New Zealand
St. Peter's Cathedral, Hamilton, the Anglican cathedral in Hamilton, located in the Waikato Region of North Island, New Zealand. It is located on a small hill, known as Cathedral Hill (Pukerangiora in Maori), in the southern central part of the city off Victoria Street

Spain
 Cathedral of Jaca, dedicated to St. Peter

United Kingdom
 Exeter Cathedral, Exeter, England, formally known as "Cathedral Church of Saint Peter, Exeter"
 Bradford Cathedral, Bradford, England, formally known as "Cathedral Church of St Peter, Bradford"
 Cathedral Church of St Peter, St Paul and St Andrew, Peterborough, Peterborough, England, also known as Saint Peter's Cathedral
 Lancaster Cathedral, Lancaster, England, formally known as "Saint Peter's Cathedral, Lancaster"
 St Peter's Cathedral, Belfast, Northern Ireland
 York Minster, York, England, dedicated to St. Peter and formally known as "Cathedral and Metropolitical Church of Saint Peter in York"

United States (by state)
See: :Category:Roman Catholic cathedrals in the United States
Our Lady of Mt. Lebanon-St. Peter Cathedral (Los Angeles), California (Maronite Catholic)
St. Peter Chaldean Catholic Cathedral (El Cajon, California), seat for the Eparchy of St. Peter the Apostle
Cathedral of Saint Peter (Wilmington, Delaware), Roman Catholic Diocese of Wilmington
Cathedral Church of St. Peter (St. Petersburg, Florida), Episcopal Diocese of Southwest Florida
Cathedral Church of St Peter (Tallahassee, Florida), ACNA Gulf Atlantic Diocese
St. Peter's Cathedral (Belleville, Illinois), Roman Catholic Diocese of Belleville
Cathedral of Saint Peter (Rockford, Illinois), Roman Catholic Diocese of Rockford
Cathedral of Saint Peter (Kansas City, Kansas), Roman Catholic Archdiocese of Kansas City
St. Peter Cathedral (Marquette, Michigan), listed on the National Register of Historic Places (NRHP) in Marquette County
Cathedral of St. Peter the Apostle (Jackson, Mississippi), the seat of the Bishop of the Roman Catholic Diocese of Jackson, Mississippi
St. Peter's Cathedral (Helena, Montana), Episcopal Diocese of Montana
Cathedral Basilica of Saint Peter in Chains (Cincinnati), Ohio, listed on the NRHP in Hamilton County
St. Peter Cathedral (Erie, Pennsylvania)
Cathedral Basilica of Saints Peter and Paul (Philadelphia), Pennsylvania, listed on the NRHP in Philadelphia County
St. Peter's Cathedral (Scranton, Pennsylvania) (Roman Catholic), listed on the NRHP in Lackawanna County

Vatican City
 St. Peter's Basilica, a church often mistaken for a cathedral
 Old St. Peter's Basilica, the building that once stood on the spot where the Basilica of Saint Peter stands today in Rome

See also
St. Peter's Church (disambiguation)
St. Peter's (disambiguation)
Cathédrale Saint-Pierre (disambiguation)